The wart-biter (Decticus verrucivorus)  is a bush-cricket in the family Tettigoniidae. Its common and scientific names derive from the eighteenth-century Swedish practice of allowing the crickets to nibble at warts to remove them.

Description
They are typically dark green in colour, usually with dark brown blotches on the pronotum and wings (a dark brown morphotype also occurs). The female has a long and slightly upcurved ovipositor.

The wart-biter has a song consisting of a rapidly repeated series of short bursts of clicks, sometimes lasting for several minutes.

Wart-biters normally move about by walking; they rarely fly, except when frightened. Most can only fly  at a time.

Subspecies
The Orthoptera Species File lists:
 D. verrucivorus assiduus Ingrisch, Willemse & Heller, 1992
 D. verrucivorus brevipennis Götz, 1970
 D. verrucivorus crassus Götz, 1970
 D. verrucivorus gracilis Uvarov, 1930
 D. verrucivorus latipennis Liu, Chen & Liu, 2020
 D. verrucivorus longipennis Nedelkov, 1907
 D. verrucivorus mithati Ramme, 1939
 D. verrucivorus monspeliensis Rambur, 1838
 D. verrucivorus sayram Liu, Chen & Liu, 2020
 D. verrucivorus stoljarovi Götz, 1970
 D. verrucivorus verrucivorus (Linnaeus, 1758) - nominate subspecies, to which the 'wart-biter' belongs.

Habitat
The species is found in calcareous grassland and heathland habitats.

Wart-biters need a mosaic of vegetation, including bare ground/short turf, grass tussocks, and a sward rich in flowering forbs. They prefer areas that are not heavily grazed. The species is thermophilous, and tends to occur on sites with a southerly aspect.

Diet
The species is omnivorous. Plants eaten include knapweed, nettles, bedstraws; the species also eats insects, including other grasshoppers. Despite its name, the eponymous warts are not a major part of its diet.

Life cycle
The wart-biter lays its eggs in the soil; these eggs normally hatch after two winters. It then passes through seven instar stages between April and June. The adult stage is reached in the beginning of July. Wart-biter populations peak in late July and early August. Newly hatched Decticus are encased in a sheath to facilitate their trip to the soil surface, the sheath holding the legs and antennae safely against the body while burrowing upwards. A neck which can in turn be inflated and deflated, enlarges the top of its tunnel, easing its passage upwards.

Status and distribution
This species occurs throughout continental Europe, except the extreme south, ranging from southern Scandinavia to Portugal,  Spain, Italy, and Greece. It is also found in temperate Asia, as far east as China. Geographic features such as mountains have fragmented the species, leading to a wide range of forms and numerous subspecies.

In Britain, the wart-biter is confined to five sites, two in East Sussex, and one each in Wiltshire, Essex, Dorset and Kent.

Conservation
The population of wart-biters has declined in many areas of northern Europe. In Britain, it is threatened with extirpation. The species is the subject of a United Kingdom Biodiversity Action Plan.

References

External links
 Wart-biter page at ARKive

Tettigoniidae
Orthoptera of Europe
Insects described in 1758
Taxa named by Carl Linnaeus